Simon Brooks (born 1971) is a Welsh editor.

Simon Brooks may also refer to:

Simon Brooks, fictional character in The Palace
Simon Brooks, one of the Candidates of the 2007 New South Wales state election

See also
Simon Brook (disambiguation)